TV5 Monde Style is a TV channel of TV5Monde dedicated to the "French way of life" (l'art de vivre à la française) broadcasting since April 8, 2015 in the Asia-Pacific and Arab world. While TV5 Monde is already available worldwide with a general channel with news, movies, documentaries, magazines and cultural programming, TV5 Monde Style is concentrating on lifestyle programming.

It broadcasts programs in fashion, luxury, hospitality, jewelry, gastronomy, oenology, design, garden art, architecture, cultural and historical heritage.

Distribution
TV5 Monde Style is broadcast mainly in the Middle East and Asia-Pacific region via satellite, with subtitles in several languages (full subtitles in English, traditional Chinese and simplified Chinese, and partial subtitles in Arabic).

References

External links
 

Television stations in France
Television channels and stations established in 2015
2015 establishments in France
French-language television stations
International broadcasters
Mass media in Paris